The Maramureș dialect (subdialectul/graiul maramureșean) is one of the dialects of the Romanian language (Daco-Romanian). Its geographic distribution covers approximately the historical region of Maramureș, now split between Romania and Ukraine.

Classification

The Maramureș dialect belongs to the group of relatively fragmented Transylvanian varieties, along with the Crișana dialect. This places the Maramureș dialect in the northern group of Romanian dialects, which also includes Moldavian dialect and  Banat, as opposed to the southern grouping which consists of the Wallachian subdialect alone.

In the context of the transition-like and very fragmented speech varieties of Transylvania, the classification of the Maramureș dialect as a separate variety is made difficult—like the Crișana dialect, or even more so—by the small number of distinctive phonetic features. This difficulty made many researchers, in particular in earlier stages of the dialectal studies of Romanian, to not recognize an individual Maramureș dialect; this view was held by Gustav Weigand, Alexandru Philippide, Iorgu Iordan, and Emanuel Vasiliu among others. Subsequent analyses admit the existence of this variety, albeit with some reluctance, leading some researchers (such as Emil Petrovici and Sextil Pușcariu) to elaborate different classifications according to different criteria, depending on which the Maramureș variety is or is not individualized. Current classifications, owed to Romulus Todoran, Ion Coteanu and others, recognize a separate Maramureș dialect.

Geographic distribution

The Maramureș dialect is spoken in the approximate area of the Maramureș historical region, including parts of both Romania and Ukraine. In Romania, the dialectal area covers the north-eastern part of the Maramureș County, along the valleys of the Tisza, Vișeu, Mara, and Cosău; many people are concentrated in Sighetu Marmației, Vișeu and Borșa. In Ukraine, speakers are found in the eastern part of the Zakarpattia Oblast (Northern Maramureș); their number is decreasing.

Subdivisions

Although spoken on a small area, the Maramureș dialect can be further divided, by using particularities that are mostly lexical, into three branches:

a wide central part of the area, which is the most representative;
the north-western part has influences from the variety spoken in the Oaș Country;
the south-eastern part.

Particularities

Many particularities are shared with the Crișana dialect as well as with the other neighboring Transylvanian varieties, and some with the Moldavian dialect.

Phonetic features

When  appears in two consecutive syllables, the first  opens to :  (standard fete ).
The diphthong  monophthongizes to :  for standard ușoară , noapte .
After the consonants  front vowels become central, whereas the diphthong  monophthongizes to :  for standard singur, seară, zeamă, jir, țin, zi.
Consonants  are less palatal than in the standard language and have the effect of centralizing a following  to :  for standard cer, ger.
After labials,  becomes  and the diphthong  is monophthongized to :  for standard merg, meargă, pe.
The diphthong  becomes  in certain words:  for standard băiat, muiat.
Devocalized  are found in word-final positions:  for standard păcurar, cer.
The diphthong  monophthongizes to :  for standard câine, mâine, pâine.
Etymologic  is preserved in words like îmblu, îmflu, întru (standard umblu, umflu, intru).
Archaic  are preserved in words like  (compare with standard ).
The consonants  are palatalized when followed by front vowels:  for lemne, vine.
The palatalization of labials before front vowels takes specific forms:
 becomes :  for standard piele;
 becomes :  for standard bine;
 becomes :  for standard mic;
 becomes :  for standard să fie;
 becomes :  for standard vierme.

Morphological and syntactical features

The possessive article is invariable: a meu, a mea, a mei, a mele ("mine", compare with standard al meu, a mea, ai mei, ale mele).
The proximal demonstrative pronouns are closer to their Latin etymons: aista, aiasta.
Some verbs of the 1st and 4th conjugation groups do not take the -ez and -esc suffixes: lucră, mă rușin, străluce ("he works", "I feel shy", "it shines", compare with standard lucrează, mă rușinez, strălucește). On the other hand, the suffix -esc does sometimes occur in verbs conjugated without it in the standard language: împărțăsc, omorăsc, simțăsc ("I divide", "I kill", "I feel", compare with standard împart, omor, simt).
Certain verb forms have  replaced with other sounds:  ("I say", "I come", "coming", compare with standard spun, vin, venind). This feature is shared with the Wallachian dialect.
The auxiliary used for the compound perfect of verbs in the 3rd person is o for the singular and or / o for the plural:  ("he said", "they said", compare with standard a zis, au zis).
The pluperfect can also be built analytically: m-am fost dus, am fost venit ("I had gone", "I had come", compare with the standard syntactic forms mă dusesem, venisem).
Verbs a aduce "to bring" and a veni "to come" have particular imperative forms: adă, vină (standard adu, vino).
There is a general tendency toward shorting the words: o fo (standard a fost), Gheo (instead of Gheorghe, a male first name), etc.

Lexical particularities

Specific words: a cușăi ("to taste", standard a gusta), cocon ("child", standard copil), pup ("flower bud", standard boboc), potică ("drugstore", standard farmacie), zierme ("snake", standard șarpe).

Sample

Maramureș dialect: 

Standard Romanian: Se roagă lui Dumnezeu, își face cruce și zice: Doamne, ajută-mi. Și femeia ia un ou și-l sparge de car, ca să-i fie ușoară arătura, ca și oul.

English translation: "She prays to God, she crosses herself, and says: God, help me. And the woman takes an egg and breaks it on the cart, so that the plowing will be light [easy] like the egg."

Bibliography

Ilona Bădescu, "Dialectologie", teaching material for the University of Craiova 
Vasile Ursan, "Despre configurația dialectală a dacoromânei actuale", Transilvania (new series), 2008, No. 1, pp. 77–85 
Elena Buja, Liliana Coposescu, Gabriela Cusen, Luiza Meseșan Schmitz, Dan Chiribucă, Adriana Neagu, Iulian Pah, Raport de țară: România, country report for the Lifelong Learning Programme MERIDIUM

Notes

Further reading

Mioara Avram, Marius Sala, Enciclopedia limbii române, Editura Univers Enciclopedic, 2001

See also
Romanian phonology

Romanian language varieties and styles
Maramureș